Citygate is a commercial complex at the town centre of Tung Chung, Lantau Island, Hong Kong. It comprises a shopping centre called Citygate Outlets, an office tower, and the Novotel Citygate hotel.

When it first opened for business in 2000, the shopping centre component was simply known as Citygate. Following a major shift in market position, the mall renamed itself Citygate Outlets in August 2006.

History
Construction commenced in 1995, and was completed in 1999. The entire complex is built on reclaimed land. The combined retail-office complex is a key feature of Tung Chung New Town, which was designed and built as a complement to the construction of Chek Lap Kok International Airport, also on reclaimed land. Phase I of the Citygate shopping centre opened in April 2000.

It was developed, and is presently owned by, Newfoundworld Investment Holdings Limited, a consortium of Swire Properties, Hang Lung Development, Henderson Land, New World Development, and Sun Hung Kai Properties. Each company owns a 20% stake in the venture. The Citygate Outlets shopping centre is managed by Swire Properties Management Limited.

The 440-room Novotel Citygate hotel, managed by AccorHotels, opened in April 2006. It targets business travelers, housing a business centre as well as conference facilities.

The phase 2 extension opened in 2019. With the opening of its new extension, the Mall has doubled in size and now houses over 150 international brands offering up to 90%-year-round discounts; with a host of retailers launching their first outlet store in Hong Kong. The Mall also features 40 F&B outlets – including a food court and al fresco eateries for food aficionados to explore – as well as a 600-seat cinema to entertain local visitors and tourists alike.

Location
Citygate Outlets is in Tung Chung, above Tung Chung MTR station, which is the terminus of the Tung Chung line. The mall is also next door to Tung Chung bus terminus, and is directly connected to the Novotel Citygate Hong Kong hotel. Hong Kong International Airport is 10 minutes away by bus.

Design
Citygate Outlets has 942,800 square feet of retail space. The Citygate complex also includes  of office space, as well as subterranean parking for over 1,100 cars. The 440-room Novotel Citygate Hong Kong hotel is also connected to the mall.

Citygate Outlets has made extensive use of glass and natural light. The mall features two sky-lit atriums, located at the northern and southern ends of the complex. These two atriums are connected to one another by walkways. The mall comprises five storeys, two of which are basement levels. There is a large restaurant-in-restaurant called Food Republic on the mall's topmost level. 
Unusually for Hong Kong, Citygate Outlets includes a large open-air piazza called The Square. One of the largest outdoor kinetic fountain in Asia is located here, and the space is often used for artistic performances, open-air exhibitions and special events.

The shopping centre spans the North Lantau Highway. Residents of the eastern half of Tung Chung must therefore walk through the shopping centre on their way to and from the railway station.

Positioning
The first outlet mall in Hong Kong, Citygate Outlets is home to more than 150 international brands offering year-round discounts of 30% to 70% on designer fashion, sports, beauty, accessories, children's wear, and home items. Citygate Outlets also features a spa, trendy restaurants, and one of the largest outdoor kinetic fountains in Asia.

In 2007, Citygate Outlets won a Silver in the International Council of Shopping Centre MAXI Awards (Category Integration section). It was the first time that a mall in Asia won an ICSC MAXI Award.

Offices
Hong Kong Airlines has its head office on the seventh floor of the building, as did HK Express. Metrojet Limited has its head office in suites 1301 through 1306 in One Citygate.

See also

 Lantau Island

References

External links

 

Shopping centres in Hong Kong
Swire Group
Hang Lung Group
Henderson Land Development
New World Development
Sun Hung Kai Properties
Tung Chung
2000 establishments in Hong Kong
Lantau Island